GRRR! is a greatest hits album by the Rolling Stones. Released on 12 November 2012, it commemorates the band's 50th anniversary. The album features two new songs titled "Doom and Gloom" and "One More Shot", which were recorded in August 2012.

"Doom and Gloom" peaked at No. 61 in the UK Charts, No. 26 on the Billboard Japan Hot 100 and No. 30 on the Billboard Rock Songs chart in October 2012. Rolling Stone named "Doom and Gloom" the 18th best song of 2012.

The album reached No. 3 on the UK Albums Chart and No. 19 on the Billboard 200.

Editions
40-track, 2-CD jewel case with 12-page booklet, only sold in Australia, Asia, some European countries and selected American retailers
50-track, 3-CD digipak with 12-page booklet
50-track, 3-CD box set with 36-page hardcover book and five postcards
50-track, 5-12" vinyl box set
50-track, 1-Blu-ray Pure Audio, no video, clear Blu-ray case, 12-page booklet, European & Mexico only
80-track, 4-CD boxset with bonus CD, 7" vinyl, hardcover book, poster, and postcards

Artwork
Walton Ford was commissioned to do the album cover. The artwork depicts a gorilla with the Stones' tongue and lips logo created by John Pasche, an adaptation of Ford's series of King Kong paintings entitled "I Don’t Like to Look at Him, Jack. It Makes Me Think of that Awful Day on the Island". Ford explained that he "saw the Rolling Stones as a sort of silverback,” and the band could be compared to Kong due to "their kind of enormity of their accomplishment over the period of 50 years.” The band approved the image declaring that “The irreverence of Walton Ford’s imagery captured the spirit of the tour”, but fans were not so welcoming. Ford reacted to the criticism saying "the last people who I wanted to please were Rolling Stones fans”, as he felt they "got their own grudges" and "just seem to be always angry at the Rolling Stones for a lot of reasons". Limited editions of the art were made by Ford and put on sale. An augmented reality app allowed to see an animated version of the GRRR! cover. Hingston Studios handled the album's  art direction, including the handwritten font used in the cover and its campaign.

Track listings
All songs by Mick Jagger and Keith Richards, except where noted.

Origin Key

 * – Non-album single
 B – Non-album B-side
 RS – The Rolling Stones (EP) (1964)
 1 – The Rolling Stones (album) (1964)
 1A – England's Newest Hit Makers (1964)
 2A – 12 X 5 (1964)
 2 – The Rolling Stones No. 2 (1965)
 3A – The Rolling Stones, Now! (1965)
 3 – Out of Our Heads (UK) (1965)
 4A – Out of Our Heads (US) (1965)
 5A – December's Children (And Everybody's) (1965)
 BH – Big Hits (High Tide and Green Grass) (1966)
 4 – Aftermath (UK) (1966)
 6A – Aftermath (US) (1966)
 7A – Between the Buttons (US) (1967)
 F – Flowers (1967)
 6 – Their Satanic Majesties Request (1967)
 7 – Beggars Banquet (1968)
 TPD – Through the Past, Darkly (Big Hits Vol. 2) (1969)
 8 – Let It Bleed (1969)
 9 – Sticky Fingers (1971)
 10 – Exile on Main St. (1972)
 11 – Goats Head Soup (1973)
 12 – It's Only Rock 'n Roll (1974)
 13 – Black and Blue (1976)
 14 – Some Girls (1978)
 15 – Emotional Rescue (1980)
 16 – Tattoo You (1981)
 17 – Undercover (1983)
 18 – Dirty Work (1986)
 19 – Steel Wheels (1989)
 FP – Flashpoint (1991)
 20 – Voodoo Lounge (1994)
 S – Stripped (1995)
 21 – Bridges to Babylon (1997)
 FL – Forty Licks (2002) 
 22 – A Bigger Bang (2005)
 EMS – Exile on Main St. reissue (2010)
 + – New, previously unreleased song (2012)

40 track version

Disc one
"Come On" (Chuck Berry)* – 1:51
"Not Fade Away" (Charles Hardin/Norman Petty)1A – 1:48
"It's All Over Now" (Bobby Womack/Shirley Jean Womack)2A – 3:28
"Little Red Rooster" (Willie Dixon)3A – 3:06
"The Last Time"4A – 3:42
"(I Can't Get No) Satisfaction"4A – 3:45
"Get Off of My Cloud"5A – 2:56
"As Tears Go By" (Jagger/Richards/Andrew Loog Oldham)5A – 2:46
"19th Nervous Breakdown"* – 3:58
"Have You Seen Your Mother, Baby, Standing in the Shadow?"BH – 2:37
"Paint It Black"6A – 3:24
"Let's Spend the Night Together"7A – 3:37
"Ruby Tuesday"7A – 3:16
"Jumpin' Jack Flash"* – 3:43
"Street Fighting Man"7 – 3:15
"Sympathy for the Devil"7 – 6:19
"Honky Tonk Women"* – 3:02
"You Can't Always Get What You Want (Single version)"8 – 4:48
"Gimme Shelter"8 – 4:32
"Wild Horses"9 – 5:46

Disc two
"Brown Sugar"9 – 3:50
"Tumbling Dice"10 – 3:46
"It's Only Rock 'n Roll (But I Like It) (Edited Version)"12 – 4:11
"Angie"11 – 4:32
"Fool to Cry (Edited version)"13 – 4:08
"Beast of Burden (Single version)"14 – 3:30
"Miss You (7" Re-Mix Version)"14 – 3:34
"Respectable"14 – 3:09
"Emotional Rescue (Edited version)"15 – 3:43
"Start Me Up"16 – 3:32
"Waiting on a Friend"16 – 4:35
"Happy"10 – 3:06
"Undercover of the Night (Edited version)"17 – 4:13
"Harlem Shuffle" (Earl Nelson/Robert Relf)18 – 3:23
"Mixed Emotions (Single version)"19 – 4:00
"Love Is Strong"20 – 3:47
"Anybody Seen My Baby? (Edited version)" (Jagger/Richards/k.d. lang/Ben Mink)21 – 4:07
"Don't Stop (Single version)"FL – 3:29
"Doom and Gloom"+ – 3:58
"One More Shot"+ – 3:05

50 track version

Disc one
"Come On" (Berry)
"Not Fade Away" (Hardin/Petty)
"It's All Over Now" (Womack/Womack)
"Little Red Rooster" (Dixon)
"The Last Time"
"(I Can't Get No) Satisfaction"
"Time Is on My Side" (Jerry Ragovoy)2, 2A
"Get Off of My Cloud"
"Heart of Stone"3A, 3
"19th Nervous Breakdown"
"As Tears Go By" (Jagger/Richards/Oldham)
"Paint It Black"
"Under My Thumb"4, 6A
"Have You Seen Your Mother, Baby, Standing in the Shadow?"
"Ruby Tuesday"
"Let's Spend the Night Together"
"We Love You"*

Disc two
"Jumpin' Jack Flash"
"Honky Tonk Women"
"Sympathy for the Devil"
"You Can't Always Get What You Want"
"Gimme Shelter"
"Street Fighting Man"
"Wild Horses"
"She's a Rainbow"6
"Brown Sugar"
"Happy"
"Tumbling Dice"
"Angie"
"Rocks Off"10
"Doo Doo Doo Doo Doo (Heartbreaker)"11
"It's Only Rock 'n Roll (But I Like It)"
"Fool to Cry"

Disc three
"Miss You"
"Respectable"
"Beast of Burden"
"Emotional Rescue"
"Start Me Up"
"Waiting on a Friend"
"Undercover of the Night"
"She Was Hot"17
"Streets of Love"22
"Harlem Shuffle" (Nelson/Relf)
"Mixed Emotions"
"Highwire"FP
"Love Is Strong"
"Anybody Seen My Baby?" (Jagger/Richards/lang/Mink)
"Don't Stop"
"Doom and Gloom"
"One More Shot"

80 track version

Disc one
"Come On" (Berry)
"I Wanna Be Your Man" (John Lennon/Paul McCartney)*
"Not Fade Away" (Hardin/Petty)
"That's How Strong My Love Is" (Roosevelt Jamison)3, 4A
"It's All Over Now" (Womack/Womack)
"Little Red Rooster" (Dixon)
"The Last Time"
"(I Can't Get No) Satisfaction"
"Heart of Stone"
"Get Off of My Cloud"
"She Said Yeah" (Sonny Christy/Roddy Jackson)3
"I'm Free"3
"Play with Fire" (Nanker Phelge)4A
"Time Is on My Side" (Ragovoy)
"19th Nervous Breakdown"
"Paint It Black"
"Have You Seen Your Mother, Baby, Standing in the Shadow?"
"She's a Rainbow"
"Under My Thumb"
"Out of Time"4, F
"As Tears Go By" (Jagger/Richards/Oldham)

Disc two
"Let's Spend the Night Together"
"Mother's Little Helper"4
"We Love You"
"Dandelion"B
"Lady Jane"4, 6A
"Flight 505"4, 6A
"2000 Light Years from Home"6
"Ruby Tuesday"
"Jumpin' Jack Flash"
"Sympathy for the Devil"
"Child of the Moon"B
"Salt of the Earth"7
"Honky Tonk Women"
"Midnight Rambler"8
"Gimme Shelter"
"You Got the Silver"8
"You Can't Always Get What You Want"
"Street Fighting Man"
"Wild Horses"

Disc three
"Brown Sugar"
"Bitch"9
"Tumbling Dice"
"Rocks Off"
"Happy"
"Doo Doo Doo Doo Doo (Heartbreaker)"
"Angie"
"It's Only Rock 'n Roll (But I Like It)"
"Dance Little Sister"12
"Fool to Cry"
"Respectable"
"Miss You"
"Shattered"14
"Far Away Eyes"14
"Beast of Burden"
"Emotional Rescue"
"Dance (Pt. 1)" (Jagger/Richards/Ronnie Wood)15
"She's So Cold"15
"Waiting on a Friend"
"Neighbours"16

Disc four
"Start Me Up"
"Undercover of the Night"
"She Was Hot"
"Harlem Shuffle" (Nelson/Relf)
"Mixed Emotions"
"Highwire"
"Almost Hear You Sigh" (Jagger/Richards/Steve Jordan)19
"You Got Me Rocking"20
"Love Is Strong"
"I Go Wild"20
"Like a Rolling Stone" (Bob Dylan)S
"Anybody Seen My Baby?" (Jagger/Richards/k.d. lang/Ben Mink)
"Saint of Me"21
"Don't Stop"
"Rough Justice"22
"Rain Fall Down"22
"Streets of Love"
"Plundered My Soul"EMS
"Doom and Gloom"
"One More Shot"

Bonus disc – IBC demos, 1963
"Diddley Daddy" (Ellas McDaniel/Harvey Fuqua)+
"Road Runner" (McDaniel)+
"Bright Lights, Big City" (Jimmy Reed)+
"Honey What's Wrong" (Reed) (aka "Baby, What's Wrong")+
"I Want to Be Loved" (Dixon)+

7-inch vinyl EP – BBC session, 1964
Side one
"Route 66" (Bobby Troup)1, 1A
"Cops and Robbers" (Kent Harris)+

Side two
"You Better Move On" (Arthur Alexander)RS
"Mona (I Need You Baby)" (McDaniel)1

Personnel
Mick Jagger (all tracks) – lead vocals, harmonica, guitars, keyboards, percussion
Keith Richards (all tracks) – acoustic and electric guitars, vocals (lead vocals on "Happy", "You Got the Silver" and the first verse of "Salt of the Earth"), keyboards, bass guitar, percussion
Charlie Watts (all tracks) – drums, percussion
Brian Jones (1962–69) – guitars, harmonica, keyboards, percussion, backing vocals, sitar, mellotron, recorder, appalachian dulcimer, saxophone, marimba, xylophone, vibraphone, tambura, autoharp
Bill Wyman (1962–91) – bass guitar, keyboards, backing vocals, percussion
Mick Taylor (1969–74) – guitars, bass guitar, backing vocals
Ronnie Wood (1975–present) – guitars, bass guitar, backing vocals

Charts

Weekly charts

Year-end charts

Singles

Certifications

Release history

References

External links
GRRR! on The Rolling Stones' official website

2012 greatest hits albums
The Rolling Stones compilation albums
ABKCO Records compilation albums
Polydor Records compilation albums
Interscope Records compilation albums
Albums produced by Jeff Bhasker
Albums produced by Emile Haynie
Albums produced by Jimmy Miller